Those About to Die is an upcoming epic sword-and-sandal television series developed by Robert Rodat and directed by Roland Emmerich.

Premise
Chronicles the world of gladiators in Ancient Rome.

Cast
 Anthony Hopkins as Vespasian
 Dimitri Leonidas as Scorpus
 Jojo Macari as Domitian Flavianus
 Gabriella Pession as Antonia
 Iwan Rheon as Tenax
 Sarah Martins-Court a Cala
 Moe Hashim as Kwame
 Tom Hughes as Titus Flavianus
 Liraz Charhi as Berenice
 Jóhannes Haukur Jóhannesson as Viggo
 Rupert Penry-Jones as Marsus
 Eneko Sagardoy
 Pepe Barroso
 Gonçalo Almeida
 Kyshan Wilson as Aura
 Alicia Edogamhe

Production
It was announced in July 2022 that Peacock had issued a series order for the project, which will be written by Robert Rodat and directed by Roland Emmerich. The series has a budget of $140 million, and was expected to begin production in early 2023.

In January 2023, Anthony Hopkins was cast. Dimitri Leonidas, Gabriella Pession, Lorenzo Richelmy and Tom Hughes were cast in February, with Marco Kreuzpaintner joining Emmerich as a director. Production began at Cinecittà in Rome in March with additional casting announced including Iwan Rheon, who was cast to replace Richelmy.

References

External links
Those About to Die at the Internet Movie Database

Peacock (streaming service) original programming